Possession is an Australian television soap opera made by the Reg Grundy Organisation for the Nine Network in 1985. It was the brainchild of the television producer, Reg Watson. The pilot was written by Bevan Lee and executive produced by Don Battye.

The series began with a convoluted espionage incident that uncovered the interpersonal dramas and family secrets of several wealthy, powerful and glamorous women, their handsome young lovers, and long-lost children.

It was not a popular success and only ran to 52 episodes. Production was cancelled in May 1985. Director of publicity for Nine, Sue Ward said "We did a complete series. We just didn't take up the option of a second series because it didn't rate." The later episodes played out in a late-night time slot due to low ratings.

Nine asked the Australian Broadcasting Tribunal to extend the local drama quota time past 10.00 pm to allow the network to move the low-rated series out of prime time and still have the episodes count toward their local drama content. When the tribunal agreed Nine moved Possession to a graveyard slot.

Cast
Original cast members
 Bruce Barry as David Macarthur, a wealthy tycoon killed off by ASIS agents in the show's premiere
 Lou Brown as Alan Morton
 Tracey Callander as Kathleen Dawson, Greg's fiancee
 Anne Charleston as Elizabeth Macarthur, David's wife
 Lyn Collingwood as Iris Dawson
 Maggie Millar as Claudia Valenti, Louise's business partner
 Lloyd Morris as Greg Macarthur, David's son
 Eric Oldfield as Gerry Foster
 Tamasin Ramsay as Jane Andrews, illegitimate daughter of David and Louise
 David Reyne as Detective Vince Bailey, investigating David's murder
 Darien Takle as Louise Carpenter, David's former mistress
 Norman Yemm as John Andrews, Jane's adopted father

Later additions
 Briony Behets as Eve Cambridge
 Max Cullen as Harry Keane, an intelligence agent
 Maggie Dence as Lady Shannon
 Ally Fowler as Nicola Shannon
 Bryan Marshall as Oliver Hearst

References

External links

Possession at the National Film and Sound Archive

Nine Network original programming
Australian television soap operas
1985 Australian television series debuts
1985 Australian television series endings
English-language television shows
Television series produced by The Reg Grundy Organisation